Genadi Juan Alberto Lugo (born 6 May 1989) is a Bulgarian footballer of Cuban descent, currently playing for Septemvri Tervel as a defender. Lugo was raised in Spartak Varna's youth teams.

References

External links
 footmercato profile 
 FUPA profile 
 

1989 births
Living people
Bulgarian footballers
First Professional Football League (Bulgaria) players
Second Professional Football League (Bulgaria) players
PFC Spartak Varna players
FC Chernomorets Balchik players
Bulgarian expatriate footballers
Bulgarian expatriate sportspeople in Germany
Expatriate footballers in Germany
Bulgarian people of Cuban descent
Sportspeople from Varna, Bulgaria
Association football defenders